Carphurus is a genus of soft-wing flower beetles (beetles of the family Melyridae) in the subfamily Malachiinae and tribe Carphurini. Species are found mainly in Australia, and in Papua-New Guinea.

References

External links 
 
 
 
 Carphurus at Atlas of Living Australia

Cleroidea genera
Melyridae